Cochylichroa temerana is a species of moth of the family Tortricidae. It is found in North America, where it has been recorded from Connecticut, Illinois, Indiana, Kentucky, Louisiana, Maine, Maryland, Massachusetts, Minnesota, New Brunswick, Ohio, Oklahoma, Ontario, Pennsylvania, Quebec and Tennessee.

The wingspan is 11–13 mm. Adults have been recorded on wing from March to August.

Cochylichroa temerana was formerly a member of the genus Cochylis, but was moved to the redefined genus Cochylichroa in 2019 as a result of phylogenetic analysis.

References

Tortricinae
Moths described in 1907